John Theodore Logan (1871 – after 1896) was a Scottish professional footballer born in Edinburgh who played in the English Football League for Small Heath. Logan, an outside left, was on the books of Partick Thistle before joining Small Heath in 1896. He played only one competitive game, in the Second Division on 31 October 1896, a 1–0 home defeat to Grimsby Town, before returning to Scotland to play for Musselburgh.

References

1871 births
Year of death missing
Footballers from Edinburgh
Scottish footballers
Association football forwards
Partick Thistle F.C. players
Birmingham City F.C. players
English Football League players
Place of death missing